EU Allowances (EUA) are climate credits (or carbon credits) used in the European Union Emissions Trading Scheme (EU ETS). EU Allowances are issued by the EU Member States into Member State Registry accounts. By April 30 of each year, operators of installations covered by the EU ETS must surrender an EU Allowance for each ton of CO2 emitted in the previous year.
The emission allowance is defined in Article 3(a) of the EU ETS Directive as being "an allowance to emit one tonne of carbon dioxide equivalent during a specified period, which shall be valid only for the purposes of meeting the requirements of this Directive and shall be transferable in accordance with the provisions of this Directive".

The EU Allowances are connected to the EUs goal of achieving climate neutrality in the EU by 2050 and a 55% reduction in greenhouse gas emissions by 2030.

Cap and trade system

The EU ETS works on the 'cap and trade' principle. Companies receive or buy emission allowances within the cap and they are allowed to trade them with one another. The total number of allowances is limited, which ensures that they have a value. If a company emits more in a year than its allowances, then heavy fines can be imposed. The fine is 100 euros per excess tonne, but the company still needs to surrender EUAs for the uncovered emissions in the subsequent year - so the 100 EUR fine does not present a ceiling price for EUAs. Companies that do not use their allowances can "bank" them to cover future needs or sell them to other companies.

Free allocation of Allowances
Free allocation of allowances decreases each year. Over the 2013 to 2020 trading period 43% of allowances were available for free allocation; and the manufacturing industry received 80% of its allowances for free at the beginning of that trading period which decreased gradually to 30% in 2020. On the other hand, power generators in principle do not receive any free allowance but have to buy them (except in some member states like Poland, Bulgaria, Hungary, Lithuania, etc.).

Auctioning of allowances
The default method of allocating allowances, which were not allocated for free within the EU emissions trading system (EU ETS) is auctioning. This is the most transparent allocation method, as it shows that polluters should pay and how much. The auctioning is governed by the EU ETS Auctioning Regulation, which ensures that it is conducted in an open, transparent, harmonized, and non-discriminatory manner. Currently, there are two auctioning platforms:

 European Energy Exchange (EEX), in Leipzig, is the common auction platform for the large majority of countries participating in the EU ETS and also conducts emissions auctions for Poland during the transitional period. EEX also published the volumes that will be auctioned in 2020.
 ICE Futures Europe (ICE), which acts as the United Kingdom's platform and is located in London. The first EUAA auction on ICE took place in September 2014.

Auctioning share is increasing from 2013 to 2020. In 2013, over 40% of allowances were auctioned and it is estimated that 57% of the allowances will be auctioned during 2013–2020. The volume of free allowances decreases faster than the cap. what causes more allowances being auctioned. EU ETS Directive foresees that the share of allowances to be auctioned will remain the same after 2020. EU leaders decided in October 2014 that free allocation shall not expire, but the share of allowances being auctioned will not reduce during the next decade.

Allocation of allowances in phases

Auctioned allowances in 2013-2020

Price volatility

The price of carbon is a result of supply and demand and can sometimes be volatile. The demand is linked to emissions in the EU countries, and can vary depending on factors such as temperature (increased heating demand), economic activity, and the amount of renewable energy produced from wind and solar. New investments in lowering emissions is also a factor. In 2020, the EUA prices may be also influenced by Brexit.

References 

Carbon emissions in the European Union